The seventh season of CSI: NY originally aired on CBS between September 2010 and May 2011. It consisted of 22 episodes. Its regular time slot moved to Fridays at 9pm/8c. The premiere, "The 34th Floor", concluded the story from the previous season's cliffhanger finale, "Vacation Getaway".

The season introduced a new regular character, Jo Danville, after regular Stella Bonasera moved to New Orleans to head up their crime lab. Melina Kanakaredes, who played Bonasera, did not renew her contract.

CSI: NY The Seventh Season was released on DVD in the U.S. on September 27, 2011.

Cast

Main cast
Gary Sinise as Mac Taylor
Sela Ward as Jo Danville
Carmine Giovinazzo as Danny Messer
Anna Belknap as Lindsay Messer
Robert Joy as Sid Hammerback
A. J. Buckley as Adam Ross
Hill Harper as Sheldon Hawkes
Eddie Cahill as Don Flack

Episodes

References

External links

CSI: NY Season 7 Episode List on Internet Movie Database
CSI: NY Season 7 Episode Guide on CSI Files
CSI: New York on CBS on The Futon Critic

2010 American television seasons
2011 American television seasons
07